Kayragach is a village in Batken Region of Kyrgyzstan. It is part of the Leylek District. Its population was 3,006 in 2021.

Nearby towns and villages include Beshkent and Kulundu.

References 

Populated places in Batken Region